Narxoz University is a higher education institution in Kazakhstan providing training in economics, business, finance, and law, located in the city of Almaty. Founded in 1963, the current name since 2016. The university includes 3 schools in the areas of training, research centers, scientific and educational departments, 5 representative offices in the regions of Kazakhstan, and an economic college.

History 

In 1963, the Almaty Institute of National Economy was founded in accordance with the Decree of the Government of the USSR of May 9, 1963.

In 1991, the Almaty Institute of National Economy was transformed into the Kazakh State Economic University by the decision of the Government of the Republic of Kazakhstan.

In 1993, the KSEU was transformed into the Kazakh State Academy of Management (KSAM) by the decree of the president of the Republic of Kazakhstan.

In 1999, the Institute of Economics and Finance, a branch of the KSAM, opens in Astana (nowadays, the Kazakh University of Economics, Finance and International Trade).

In 2000, the KSAM was named after Turar Ryskulov, a prominent Kazakh statesman, political and public figure and economics thinker.

In 2001, the academy was transformed into Turar Ryskulov Kazakh Economic University by the Decree of the Government of the Republic of Kazakhstan.

In 2002, Turar Ryskulov KazEU was visited by president of Kazakhstan Nursultan Nazarbayev.  The president took part in the opening ceremony of the KaxEU's Kazakh-Japanese Center for Human Resource Development and met with teachers and students of the university.

In 2002, Turar Ryskulov KazEU opened an Economics College.

In 2005, Turar Ryskulov KazEU became a basis for the Education and Methodology Section (EMS) for specialty groups of the Republican Education and Methodology Council for Higher and Postgraduate Education of the Ministry of Education and Science of the Republic of Kazakhstan. In the same year, the KazEU began to implement international educational programs in partnership with leading universities of Russia, such as Lomonosov Moscow State University, the University of People's Friendship, as well as academic, scientific and cultural exchange programs with universities in the EU and South Korea.

As of 2006, the university has been arranging the Ryskulov's Readings international scientific forum and the annual republican education and methodology conference Continuous Economics Education: Modernization of Teaching and Methodological Support. Furthermore, this year the university opened groups at departments, where subjects are taught in English, and began to implement a Dual Degree program, i.e. joint projects with partner universities overseas.

A pilot PhD program was launched offering training in two specialties.

In 2007, the university became a member of the University Consortium of the European Union and Kazakhstan and joined the Erasmus Mundus program.

In 2009, the university became a base university of the Education and Methodology Section of the Republican Education and Methodology Council, offering five Bachelor, Master and PhD degree courses (Economics, Accounting and Audit, Finance, Statistics, Labor and Workload Organization).

In 2008, the International Business School (IBS) was opened.

In 2010, the university joined the European educational environment by signing Magna Carta.

In 2011, a department of International Educational Programs was launched with subjects taught in English. Starting from 2011, the university has been hosting Science for Business, an international scientific youth forum.

In 2011–2012, the university opened regional distance learning centers in Kyzylorda, Atyrau, Shymkent and Pavlodar.

In 2012, Grandpool, a sports complex with a swimming pool, was opened.

In 2013, a regional distance learning center was opened in Semey. In the same year, the University Museum was opened after reconstruction.

On December 3, 2014, as part of the re-branding, the university changed its name to Turar Ryskulov New Economic University.

In February 2015, Krzysztof Rybiński become the rector of Turar Ryskulov New Economic University.

In 2016 the university changed its name to Narxoz University.

University management

Andrew Wachtel 
Dr. Andrew Wachtel was appointed rector of Narxoz University in 2018.
Dr. Wachtel is the author of more than a hundred academic publications and a dozen books, and is a published translator. He is a reviewer for Stanford, Cornell, Duke, Princeton, and Northwestern universities, and for Yale University Press, Routledge Publishing, The Slavic Review, SEEJ and The Russian Review. He is a full member of the US Academy of Sciences, and speaks Russian, Bosnian/Croatian/Serbian, Slovenian, French, and Polish fluently.
Prior to joining Narxoz University, Dr Wachtel served as president of AUCA (American University of Central Asia), and continues work as the head of the Association of American International Colleges and Universities.
Since 2014, Dr Wachtel has been advising the Ministry of Education of the Russian Federation concerning the development of higher education.

Having graduated from Harvard University (Faculty of History and Literature) in 1981, Wachtel gained his PhD from the University of California (Department of Slavic Languages and Literature) in 1987. He began his academic teaching career the following year at UCLA, as professor of Russian literature. Dr Wachtel worked for five years at Stanford University as assistant professor of Slavic language and literature. Subsequently, he spent twenty years working at one of the oldest universities in the United States: Northwestern University. In addition to teaching, he supervised master and doctoral programs at Northwestern, which included 3,500 students from eight schools.

Viktoriya Tsay 
Viktoriya Tsay – a graduate of Harvard University, holds a master's degree in public administration and a master's degree in business administration from Maastricht School of Management. She has extensive leadership experience in international, national and private companies.

Kamilya Amenova 
Kamilya Amenova – Master of Business Administration of MSU. She holds a PhD from Narxoz University. Member of the Chamber of Professional Accountants. As part of the top management, she is involved in the solutions of financial issues of Narxoz University.

Ratings and accreditation 
CEEMAN – The International Association for Management Development in dynamic societies, Slovenia

ACCA – Association of Chartered Certified Accountants, UK

Educational programs 
 3 languages of instruction: Kazakh, Russian, English 
 21 bachelor's degree programs 
 16 scientific-pedagogical and applied master's programs 
 Master's programs in cooperation with European partner universities 
 4 master's programs of the National Bank of the Republic of Kazakhstan
 6 programs of  PhD 
 2 programs of  the Lomonosov MSU 
 2 programs of the Peoples’ Friendship University of Russia
 12 international dual-degree  programs (bachelor's, master's, МВА, DВА)
 Business-education (DBA, executive MBA, MBA, Mini MBA) 
 More than 100  PDP programs (seminars and trainings)
 9 programs of vocational secondary education

Structure 
 Faculties and Schools: Faculty of basic training, School of economics and management, School of finance and accounting, School of applied sciences, School of international education programs  
 Postgraduate programs: Master's programs, PhD, Programs of supplementary education of M.V. Lomonosov Moscow state university  
 IBS International Business School: DBA, MBA, Executive MBA, Mini MBA programs, seminars and trainings 
 Programs of Peoples’ Friendship University of Russia (bachelor's and master's programs) 
 Regional centers of distance learning (in Kyzylorda, Shymkent, Atyrau, Pavlodar, Semei cities) 
 College of Economics (in Almaty and Talgar cities) 
 Master Program of the National Bank of the Republic of Kazakhstan 
 Linguistic center 
 Military training department 
 Kazakh – Japanese  center for development of human resources  
 Institute for Social-economic Studies 
 Research institute for finance-bank management

Famous graduates

Karim Massimov 
A former prime minister of Kazakhstan and a chairman of the National Security Committee of the Republic of Kazakhstan

He graduated from the University of Narxoz in 1995; the major is Finance and Credit.

Over the years, he served as the Minister of Transport and Communications, a deputy of the prime minister, assistant to the President of the Republic of Kazakhstan, acting secretary of state of the Republic of Kazakhstan. One of the main achievements of Mr. Masimov as the prime minister is the introduction of e-government system, the work on improving the efficiency of the public service of citizens of Kazakhstan.

Aslan Sarinzhipov 
A Politician, a former Minister of Education and Science

He graduated from the University of Narxoz in 1996; the major is International Economic Relations.

Aslan Sarinzhipov began his career as the administrative assistant of the executive committee of Interstate Council for Central Asia. In 1997, he joined Ministry of Foreign Affairs of the Republic of Kazakhstan, a year later he served as the Diplomatic Attaché on Economic issues of the Embassy of the Republic of Kazakhstan in the United States. Between 2002 and 2007, he was World Bank project coordinator for Central Asia in the sphere of infrastructure, financial markets and education. From 2009 to 2013, he served as the Minister of Education and Science of the Republic of Kazakhstan. He is currently the president of "Nazarbayev Fund" and a member of the board of trustees of the "Nazarbayev University"

Kenges Rakishev 
An Entrepreneur and a venture investor. He graduated from the University of Narxoz in 2002; the major is Economics (Master's degree).

Kenges Rakishev takes the Top 7 spot in Forbes Kazakhstan annual ranking "The 50 richest people in Kazakhstan" with a capital of $718 million and Top 5 spot out of 50 influential businessmen in Kazakhstan, according to Forbes Kazakhstan annual ranking "The top 50 most influential businessmen in Kazakhstan". Mr. Rakishev is the chairman of the board of directors of the largest Kazakh commercial bank – JSC "Kazkommertsbank", the chairman of the board of directors of Industrial Holding of the SAT & Company and the chairman of the board of directors of Net Element, the first American company with the Kazakhstani capital, which is participated in the high-tech stock exchange NASDAQ. Kenges is the member of directors' board and the strategic partner of one of the biggest Russian venture funds Fastlane Ventures and he is one of the founders of the global venture fund SingulariTeam, which focuses on the startups and breakthrough technologies in the robotic industry

Daniyar Akishev 
Governor of the National Bank of Kazakhstan. He graduated the University of Narxoz with honour in 1996; the major is Economics (specializing in Organization of Banking System).

In his 19 years, Mr. Akishev as a student of Narxoz University became the leading economist of the Central Asian Stock Exchange. During 1996–2003, he occupied different positions at the Research & Statistics Department of the National Bank of Kazakhstan, and during 2003–2007, he headed that department. From 2007 to 2014, D. Akishev was appointed a deputy governor of the National Bank of Kazakhstan. In 2015, D. Akishev temporarily worked as an assistant to the President of the Republic of Kazakhstan.

Aslan Musin 
Political figure

He graduated from the University of Narxoz in 1975; the major is Economics.

Musin began his career as the governor of Aktobe, later of Atyrau province. Over the years, he served as Minister of Economy and Budget Planning of Kazakhstan. Musin is the former Speaker of Majilis of the Parliament of Kazakhstan. He was appointed the head of the Presidential Administration, as well as the chairman of the Accounts Committee for Control over Execution of the Republican Budget.

Marat Tazhin 
Politician, former Minister of Foreign Affairs of the Republic of Kazakhstan

Graduated from the University of Narxoz in 1981; the major is Economics.

Mr. Tazhin held the position of state advisor to the president of the Republic of Kazakhstan. He was also assistant to the president for national security affairs and the head of the National Security Committee. He was the first deputy of the head of the Presidential Administration of the Republic of Kazakhstan, State Secretary of the Republic of Kazakhstan. He is currently the Extraordinary and Plenipotentiary Ambassador of Kazakhstan to Russia.

Collaboration with universities 
Improving the educational process, Narxoz University is constantly working on establishing and strengthening cooperation with leading universities in Kazakhstan and worldwide. As a result of this work Narxoz students have great opportunities for learning in the partner universities and obtaining double diplomas within the framework of joint academic programs.

List of international partners:
 PierreMendès-France University
 International Business School, Hungary
 EU Business School, Switzerland, Spain, Germany
 University of Lodz, Poland
 University of Ferrara, Italy
 ISM University of Management and Economics, Lithuania
 Otto-Friedrich-Universität Bamberg, Germany
 Luis National University, Poland
 Solbridge International Business School, Korea
 University of Tsukuba, Japan
 Nagoya University, Japan
 Gangnam University, Korea
 Southwest University for Nationalities, China
 East China Normal University, China
 Altai State University, Russia
 State University of Management, Russia
 Siberian Federal University, Russia
 Belgorod State National Research University, Russia
 Saint Petersburg State University of Economics, Russia
 Russian University of Economics named after V. Plehanova, Russia
 St. Petersburg National Research University of Information Technologies, Mechanics and Optics
 Moscow State University named after MV Lomonosov
 Ural Federal University named after Boris Yeltsin, Russia
 Voronezh State University, Russia
 Novosibirsk State Technical University, Russia
 The Bishkek Finance and Economic Academy, Kyrgyzstan
 Kyrgyz State University named after Arabaev, Kyrgyzstan
 Bishkek Humanities University named after Karasayev, Kyrgyzstan
 Northeast Normal University, China
 Dalian Nationalities University, China
 Finance and Economics Institute of Tajikistan, Tajikistan
 Tajik National University, Tajikistan
 Russian-Tajik Slavic University, Tajikistan
 Tajik State University of Law, Business and Policy, Tajikistan
 Osh State University, Kyrgyzstan
 Kyrgyz National University named after Balasagyn, Kyrgyzstan

List of Kazakhstan partners
 Aktobe Regional State University named after K. Zhubanov
 Kazakh National Technical University named after K. Satpayev
 Kazakh State Women's Pedagogical University
 Kazakh National Pedagogical University named after Abay
 Kazakh University of International Relations and WorldLanguages named after Abylaikhan
 Almaty Management University
 Kazakh National Agrarian University
 Eurasian Technological University
 Almaty Technological University
 Kazakh-British Technical University
 Turan-Astana University
 Kazakh University of Economy, Finance and International Trade
 Kazakh Agro Technical University named after S. Seifullin
 East Kazakhstan State Technical University named after D. Serikbaev
 East Kazakhstan State University named after S. Amanzholov
 Kyzylorda State University named after Korkyt Ata
 South Kazakhstan State University named after M. Auezov
 Pavlodar State University named after S. Toraigyrov
 Caspian State University of Technology and Engineering named after Sh. Yessenov
 Atyrau Institute of Oil and Gas
 West Kazakhstan State University named after M. Utemisov
 Zhetysu State University named after I. Zhansugurov
 Taraz State University named after MH Dulati
 Kokshetau State University named after Sh. Ualihanov
 Karaganda Economic University of Kazpotrebsoyuz
 Innovative University of Eurasia
 Atyrau State University named after H. Dosmukhamedov
 tate University named after Shakarim
 Zhezkazgan University named after O. Baykonurov
 Eurasian National University named after Gumilyov
 KARGU
 East Kazakhstan Regional University

References 



Narxoz University
Educational institutions established in 1963
Education in Almaty
1963 establishments in the Kazakh Soviet Socialist Republic